"Elevate My Mind" is a song by English hip hop/electronic dance group Stereo MC's, with female vocals provided by Cath Coffey. It made #74 on the UK Singles Chart, #36 on the Hot Dance Music/Maxi-Singles Sales and #39 on the Billboard Hot 100, making them the first British rap group to make the Billboard Hot 100. It features a sample of "White Lines (Don't Don't Do It)" by Grandmaster Melle Mel.

Critical reception
A reviewer from NME wrote, "Watch out! Here they come, back again to distress the session with another corker of a tune. A bouncy rhyming rap in true Stereo MCs fashion over a bubbling backbeat and '70s-style Hammond riff. A fine taster from their forthcoming LP."

In popular culture
"Elevate My Mind" was used on the soundtrack of Bad Company (1995) starring Laurence Fishburne, Ellen Barkin, and Frank Langella.
The song is used in Call of Duty: Infinite Warfare, in the Zombies map Rave in the Redwoods.

References

1990 singles
1990 songs
Stereo MCs songs
4th & B'way Records singles
Island Records singles